In phytopathology, antagonism refers to the action of any organism that suppresses or interferes with the normal growth and activity of a plant pathogen, such as the main parts of bacteria or fungi.

These organisms can be used for pest control and are referred to as biological control agents. They may be predators, parasites, parasitoids, or pathogens that attack a harmful insect, weed, or plant disease or any other organism in its vicinity. The inhibitory substance is highly specific in its action, affecting only a specific species. Many soil microorganisms are antagonistic. They secrete a potent enzyme which destroys other cells by digesting their cell walls and degrade the cellular material as well as released protoplasmic material serves as a nutrient for the inhibitor organism, for example Aspergillus has an antagonistic effect on Penicillium and Cladosporium. Trichoderma has an effect on actinomycetes. Pseudomonas show antagonism on Cladosporiumsuch organism may be of great practical importance since they often produce antibiotics which modify the normal growth processes.

Mechanism 
 Antibiosis example — enzymes, toxins, antibiotics.
 Direct parasitism example — biotrophic or necrotrophic.
 competition example — for nutrients.
 Induced resistance (indirect).

References

External links 
 
 

Physiological plant disorders
Phytopathology